Bhagna Hriday (Bengali: ভগ্নহৃদয়; English: The Broken Heart) is a Bengali long lyrical poem written by Rabindranath Tagore in 1881. He started writing it while on a trip in London. After reading Bhagna Hriday, Maharaja Bir Chandra Manikya  awarded Rabindranath Tagore the title of best poet.

References
 

   
1881 poems
Poetry collections by Rabindranath_Tagore
Bengali poetry collections
Bengali-language_poems